Adamčík (masculine), Adamčíková (feminine) is a Czech and Slovak surname. Notable people with this surname include:

 (1863-1919), Czech civil engineer, geodesist, and professor
 (1903-1992), Slovak film and theatre actress
 (1904-1984), Slovak film and theatre actor

Czech-language surnames
Slovak-language surnames